Bemis Center for Contemporary Arts is located in the Old Market Historic District of downtown Omaha, Nebraska, at the corner of 12th Street and Leavenworth Street. In addition to an international artist-in-residence program, Bemis Center hosts temporary exhibitions and commissions and public programs which are free and open to the public.

History 
Bemis Center for Contemporary Arts was founded by artists Jun Kaneko, Tony Hepburn, Lorne Falke and Ree Schonlau in 1981. In 1984, Ree Schonlau established a consortium consisting of the City of Omaha, the United States Department of Housing and Urban Development, private and corporate foundations and the Mercer family, who owned the vacant  Bemis Bag Building. The structure had originally been built as a branch of the Nave & McCord Mercantile Company.

Locations 
Bemis Center for Contemporary Arts was formerly located at the Bemis Omaha Bag Company Building, 614 South 11th Street, which was severely damaged in a fire in 1999.

Today, Bemis Center for Contemporary Arts is located in the old McCord-Brady & Co. building on 12th and Leavenworth.

See also 
 Culture in Omaha
 The Old Market

References

External links 
 Bemis Center for Contemporary Arts

Museums in Omaha, Nebraska
American artist groups and collectives
History of Downtown Omaha, Nebraska
Arts organizations established in 1981
Art museums and galleries in Nebraska
Art galleries established in 1981
1981 establishments in Nebraska
Arts centers in Nebraska
Artist residencies